Vicki Howard is a Liberal National Party councillor for the Brisbane City Council. Howard has represented Central Ward since the 2012 election, following the retirement of incumbent Labor councillor David Hinchliffe. She currently serves as Deputy Chair of Council and Deputy Chair of City Planning. Before her political career, Howard worked for Chubb Security.

References

Living people
People from Brisbane
Liberal National Party of Queensland politicians
Queensland local councillors
Year of birth missing (living people)
Women local councillors in Australia